The 1979 Colgate Red Raiders football team was an American football team that represented Colgate University as an independent during the 1971 NCAA Division I-A football season. In its fourth season under head coach Frederick Dunlap, the team compiled a 5–4–1 record. Angelo Colosimo and John Marzo were the team captains. 

The team played its home games at Andy Kerr Stadium in Hamilton, New York.

Schedule

Leading players 
Two trophies were awarded to the Red Raiders' most valuable players in 1979: 
 John Marzo, quarterback, received the Andy Kerr Trophy, awarded to the most valuable offensive player.
 Karl Grabowski, linebacker, received the Hal W. Lahar Trophy, awarded to the most valuable defensive player.

Statistical leaders for the 1979 Red Raiders included: 
 Rushing: Angelo Colosimo, 557 yards and 3 touchdowns on 153 attempts
 Passing: John Marzo, 845 yards, 71 completions and 8 touchdowns on 133 attempts
 Receiving: Frank Rossi, 282 yards and 1 touchdowns on 26 receptions
 Total offense: John Marzo, 1,005 yards (845 passing, 160 rushing)
 Scoring: Angelo Colosimo, 36 points from 6 touchdowns
 All-purpose yards: Jim Freeman, 868 yards (309 kickoff returning, 283 receiving, 276 rushing)
 Tackles: Joe Murphy, 146 total tackles
 Sacks: Jeff King, 14 quarterback sacks

References

Colgate
Colgate Raiders football seasons
Colgate Red Raiders football